Oltinsoy is a district of Surxondaryo Region in Uzbekistan. The capital lies at the town Qarluq.

The district consists of 14 urban-type settlements (Qarluq, Botosh, Jobu, Ipoq, Qurama, Boʻston, Mormin, Xayrandara, Xoʻjasoat, Chep, Shakarqamish, Ekraz, Yangiqurilish, Gulobod) and 9 rural communities.

References 

Districts of Uzbekistan
Surxondaryo Region